The Department of Women, Youth and Persons with Disabilities (DWYPD) (formerly Department of Women) is a department of the Government of South Africa with the responsibility for women, youth and persons with disabilities. As of May 2019, the Minister of Women, Youth and Persons with Disabilities is Maite Nkoana-Mashabane.

Entities
National Youth Development Agency

References

External links
Official website

Department of Women, Youth and Persons with Disabilities